The following is an episode list for the television series TV Nation. Written, directed, and hosted by Michael Moore, the show premiered in the United States on NBC on July 19, 1994. After the broadcast of the eighth episode, the show was subsequently cancelled by NBC, but was picked up by Fox for the summer of 1995. A total of 17 episodes were produced during the show's two seasons.

Season 1 
The first season of TV Nation ran from July 19, 1994, to a special New Year's episode. The following table includes short summaries of the individual segments in each episode.

Season 2 
Fox decided to air TV Nations second season during the summer of 1995. The first show aired on July 21, and ran for seven consecutive weeks in the U.S. until September 8.

{| class="wikitable" width=99%
|-
! # !! Title !! Original U.S. airdate !! Runtime !! # in total
|-
|align=center rowspan=2| 1 
|"We're #1" || July 21, 1995, 8pm EST|| 45 minutes
|align=center| 10
|-
|colspan="6"|
"Bruno for President" - TV Nation runs convicted felon Louie Bruno as its candidate in the 1996 Presidential election.
"We're #1" - A visit to cities in America that are number one in some infamous category, such as Playboy subscriptions or carjackings.
"Beach Party" - TV Nation invades the public beach of Greenwich, Connecticut, which is restricted only to residents of Greenwich. After the busload of New Yorkers TV Nation has brought to the beach is turned away, correspondent Janeane Garofalo and some of the New Yorkers take a boat out to sea and then swim onto the beach. The city of Greenwich was later brought to court over the issue.
"Crime Scene Cleanup" - A look at the Barnes, a couple who started a lucrative crime scene cleanup business.
"Slaves" - TV Nation travels to Mississippi to acquire some slaves before the state officially outlaws slavery.
"Crackers" - The introduction of Crackers the Corporate Crime Fighting Chicken, a seven-foot chicken that takes action against corporate criminals across the country. In this segment, Crackers talks to New York City mayor Rudy Giuliani about tax breaks given to First Boston financial to stay in New York, even though the company left.
|-
|colspan="6" bgcolor="#fada00"| 
|-
|align=center rowspan=2| 2 
|"Payback Night" || July 28, 1995, 8pm EST|| 45 minutes
|align=center| 11
|-
|colspan="6"|
"Payback Night" - After asking people on the street what annoys them, TV Nation visits CEOs at the heart of the complaints, performing tasks like setting off ten car alarms outside the house of a CEO of a car alarm maker, or lifting and dropping a garbage dumpster outsider the owner of a garbage company.
"KGB" - The show hires a former KGB officer named Yuri Shvets to begin conducting investigations. Shvets' first mission is to confirm that former U.S. President Richard Nixon is actually dead.
"NEA" - In response to members of Congress who want to eliminate funding for the National Endowment for the Arts, the show visits privately funded museums to examine the quality of their offerings, visiting such places as the Kentucky Fried Chicken Museum.
"A-Bomb" - A visit to a man in Idaho who unknowingly purchased the remnants of an atomic bomb factory in a U.S. government scrap metal auction.
"Jerusalem Syndrome" - TV Nation correspondent Louis Theroux investigates the phenomenon of visitors to the city of Jerusalem believing they are Jesus Christ upon reaching the holy site, a condition known as Jerusalem Syndrome.
"Johns of Justice" - Citing long lines for women's restrooms at theaters, sporting events, and other venues, TV Nation rents a flatbed truck and many portable toilets, taking them to the aforementioned venues.
|-
|colspan="6" bgcolor="#fada00"| 
|-
|align=center rowspan=2| 3
|"War Night" || August 4, 1995, 8pm EST|| unknown
|align=center| 12
|-
|colspan="6"|
"War Night" - Civil War Reenactors reenact more recent battles in their authtentic Civil War uniforms, including the fall of Saigon, the Battle of Hiroshima, a battle between Tom Arnold and Roseanne, and the battle that resulted when Elizabeth Hurley picked up Hugh Grant from Heathrow Airport.
"Cobb County" - TV Nation takes note of the fact that Cobb County, Georgia, home to outspoken "big government" critic Newt Gingrich, is the third largest receiver of federal funds. The show then tries to relieve Cobb County of government interference by closing its federally funded highways, schools, sewer system, and senior center.
"Electronic Sniffer" - The invention of machines that can detect different smells threatens the jobs of people who test products like deordorant and air freshener. TV Nation visits companies that make products like those and pit the human sniffers against their machine counterparts.
"Helltown" - After the Southern Baptist Church published a map of Alabama depicting which counties have the most "unsaved" residents, TV Nation visits the county with the most "lost" souls, and attempts to save them from eternal damnation.
"School of Assassins" - A look at a US government run School of Americas in Georgia that trains Latin America soldiers in "population control."
"Crackers in Philly" - Crackers travels to Philadelphia in search of corporate crime, discovering that banks in the city charge up to $30 for bounced check fees, even if you're not the one responsible for bouncing the check.
"Widgery" - Insight into the firm of Widgery and Associates, the legitimate polling firm that conducts all of TV Nations polls.
|-
|colspan="6" bgcolor="#fada00"| 
|-
|align=center rowspan=2| 4
|"Love Night" || August 11, 1995, 8pm EST|| 45 minutes
|align=center| 13
|-
|colspan="6"|
"Love Night" - The show spreads some love to U.S. hate groups, doing things like sending a gay men's choir to sing outside the home of Senator Jesse Helms.
"America's Most Wanted" - After being detained by Washington, D.C. police over 20 times because he resembles a fugitive, TV Nation uses billboards and radio ads in Washington to inform police that BET lighting director Brian Anthony Harris is not wanted.
"Aquariums" - An investigation into aquariums built in places like Camden, New Jersey and Long Beach, California in the hopes that they could help revive tourism and the inner cities of those communities.
"Militia" - TV Nation visits the Michigan Militia and encourages them to put down their arms and participate in democracy. Militia Commander Norm Olsen bakes a cake, and later the Militia members travel to a local carnival where they ride the Ferris Wheel and sing "Kumbaya."
"KGB" - Former KGB agent Yuri Shvets investigates TV Nations competition, including Unsolved Mysteries, Family Matters, and Diagnosis: Murder to see what those shows are doing to win in the Neilsen ratings.
|-
|colspan="6" bgcolor="#fada00"| 
|-
|align=center rowspan=2| 5
|"Canada Night" || August 25, 1995, 8pm EST|| 45 minutes
|align=center| 14
|-
|colspan="6"|
"Canada Night" - A tribute to Canada throughout the episode, as the show smuggles illegal Canadians across the United States border, and Moore sings the Canadian National Anthem before a Major League Baseball game between the Toronto Blue Jays and the Detroit Tigers.
"Contract with America" - TV Nation tries to enforce the Contract With America, a 1994 effort by the Republican party to win back control of Congress. Specifically, TV Nation notes the Contract says members of Congress must abide by all the laws regular United States citizens do. TV Nation then attempts to park a car in the "Members Only" spaces at National Airport, receive free medical care from Bethesda Naval Hospital, and use the services of the congressional cosmetologist.
"Ted Nugent" - Ted Nugent, rock legend and National Rifle Association board member, gives the show a tour of his Michigan farm while commenting on topics ranging from assault weapons to Janet Reno.
"Crackers in St. Louis" - Crackers goes to the St. Louis area town of Doe Run, Missouri to confront the lead battery factory there. The citizens of the town believe their children have been poisoned by the lead runoff from the factory, so Crackers conducted a series of lead tests and took the results to the state environmental office.
"Falklands" - Argentina promised to pay each citizen of the Falklands Islands $1,000,000 if they became a part of Argentina and renounced their British citizenship. TV Nation finds Falkland residents have little interest in the deal, but that people in the village of Maerdy in Wales were much more willing to renounce their British citizenship for $1,000,000.
|-
|colspan="6" bgcolor="#fada00"| 
|-
|align=center rowspan=2| 6
|"Fox Show 6" || September 1, 1995, 8pm EST|| 45 minutes
|align=center| 15
|-
|colspan="6"|
"Mike Hugs All 50 Governors" - After the new Republican-controlled Congress says it wants to return power to the States, TV Nation tries to touch that power by hugging the governors of all 50 states.
"Psy-Ops at O.J." - The show hires a retired U.S. Army psychological operations expert to help conduct a "psy-op" program to destabilize and reduce the massive amount of O.J. Simpson media coverage.
"Rosemont" - The wealthy Chicago suburb of Rosemont, Illinois decided to place guard booths on public streets leading into the city, allowing only people who can prove they are residents of Rosemont in. TV Nation then sets up its own guard booth on the outskirts of Rosemont to prevent the town's residents from entering Chicago.
"New Unions" - TV Nation looks at new groups of non-industrial workers who are beginning to unionize, such as the Buffalo Bills cheerleading squad and cartoon characters at Disney World.
"Endangered White Men" - The show assembles a panel of white male experts to examine the threat from the white man's supposed enemies, like minorities and women.
"America's Most Wanted Part 2" - After receiving a number of African-American viewer responses to the "Most Wanted" segment, rapper Doug E. Fresh takes the names of these TV Nation viewers to the FBI in Washington, D.C. to the tell agency that these people are not wanted by law enforcement officials.
"Fan Mail" - TV Nations candidate in the 1996 Presidential Election, Louie Bruno, answers viewer fan mail along with his campaign manager Lucky.
|-
|colspan="6" bgcolor="#fada00"| 
|-
|align=center rowspan=2| 7
|"Bully Reunion Night" || September 8, 1995, 8pm EST|| 45 minutes
|align=center| 16
|-
|colspan="6"|
"Bully Reunion Night" - Each TV Nation correspondent is reunited with their bully from high school.
"Confession" - Janeane Garofalo visits twenty Catholic churches in the New York City area to confess the same sin in order to see which church hands out the harshest punishment. (NOTE: Michael Moore originally presented the idea in his first meeting with NBC executives about TV Nation. It met with much laughter and positive reception, despite Moore's instance that, "think of all the hate mail you'll get from your Catholic viewers--including me!"  Despite Moore's reservations, the segment was filmed for the Pilot episode of TV Nation, with the "recovering Catholic" Garofalo eager to do the piece. Confident he would "burn in eternal hell" if he ran the segment, Moore decided not to include the piece in the Pilot, only to finally give in and air it in this second season episode.)
"TV Felons" - The show travels around Great Britain with "TV Cops" who bust British citizens that haven't paid for a license to watch television.
"Savings and Loan Scandal" - TV Nation outlines the history of the Savings and loan crisis, the charges, fines, convictions and outcomes for various financial institution executives (including Neil Bush, the son of then Vice President of the United States George H. W. Bush), and the overall financial impact on the United States. This segment only aired on BBC Two and did not air on Fox in the United States due to it being considered controversial by the network. It was later presented in 2003 as part of the screening series Antagonism Over the Airwaves: A Look at Controversy on Television and Radio, presented by the Museum of Television and Radio.
"Crackers -- Detroit" - Crackers investigates the strikes of the Detroit Free Press and the Detroit News, then attempts to stop the scab newspapers from being published.
"KGB4" - Yuri Shvets tries to find out what happened to the heart and soul of the Democratic Party in the United States.
"Weatherman" - After a weatherman is fired for refusing to lie and go ahead with his forecast of rain on the day of a Republican Party picnic, TV Nation hires him. This segment did not air on the BBC Two version of this episode, instead featuring in the subsequent episode.
|-
|colspan="6" bgcolor="#fada00"| 
|-
|align=center rowspan=2| 8
|"Fox Show 8'''" || only aired outside U.S. || 45 minutes
|align=center| 17
|-
|colspan="6"|
Features the Health Care Olympics, the radio weatherman who lost his job for forecasting rain, and Rusty Cundieff looking at business philosophies. The show was produced for this second season on Fox, but never found an airdate on the network (or in the United States for that matter). This episode aired exclusively on BBC Two on 9 October 1995.
|}

 Unaired segments 
The release of TV Nation'' on two VHS volumes in 1997 offered a chance to view two unaired segments considered too controversial to be aired on broadcast television at the time. In the first segment at the end of Volume One, one of the correspondents visits drug stores and inquires about extra-small sized condoms. The second unaired segment at the end of Volume Two looks at the Phelps family, known for picketing the funerals of AIDS victims.

References

External links
 

TV Nation